Falkenbergs Motorbana is a motor racing circuit at Bergagård, Sweden. The circuit was opened in 1967, as a replacement for Skreabanan, and is currently owned and run by Falkenbergs Motorklubb. A chicane was added on the first corner in 2004 to improve safety on the relatively fast track. A round of the Scandinavian Touring Car Championship (formerly known as the Swedish Touring Car Championship) is held there each year.
In addition there is a road racing event called Scandinavian Open run each year, endurance races, and a Classic motor event.

Lap records 

The fastest official race lap records at Falkenbergs Motorbana are listed as:

Notes

References

External links 

 Official website  (in Swedish)
 Falkenbergs Motorbana at etracks.

Motorsport venues in Sweden
Buildings and structures in Halland County
Falkenberg Municipality
Sports venues completed in 1967